Timofey Ivanovich Kirpichnikov (1892 – 1917/1918) was an active participant of the Russian February Revolution, where he aligned himself with the short-lived Russian Republic. Rising against Russian Empire, Kirpichnikov was the initiator of the Petrograd garrison's uprising.

Life 
Timofey Kirpichnikov was born in the Old Believers' peasant family in the village of Dmitrovka in the Saransky Uyezd of the Penza Governorate of the Russian Empire.

During World War I Kirpichnikov fought on the Austrian front, was wounded in the hand and after a hospital stay ended up in Petrograd. As a war veteran, Kirpichnikov was popular among Russian imperial soldiers, but was also noted for his sternness.

After the start of the February Revolution, Kirpichnikov was a member of the Volinsky Regiment tasked with bringing order to Petrograd. He helped lead the mutiny of this regiment against this order and was sometimes referred as the “First Soldier of the Revolution.”    During the April Crisis, when Bolsheviks led by Lenin tried to seize power, Kirpichnikov provided the Russian Provisional Government with military support which temporarily halted the crisis.

After the October Revolution, Kirpichnikov planned to join the newly formed Russian White Army fighting against Bolsheviks. Kirpichnikov, however, became unpopular among some Russian imperial officials due to his anti-imperialist stance. At the meeting with Russian imperial general Alexander Kutepov in 1917/1918 he was suddenly apprehended and summarily executed by shooting.

References 

1892 births
1910s deaths
People from Saransky Uyezd
Russian military personnel of World War I
Russian Provisional Government military personnel
People of the Russian Revolution
Extrajudicial killings
People executed by Russia by firing squad
People executed by the Russian Empire